On August 18, 2012, a Piper PA-34 Seneca light aircraft with four people on board, including Philippine Interior Secretary Jesse Robredo, crashed in the sea near the island province of Masbate, Philippines, while flying from Lapu-Lapu City to Naga, Camarines Sur. Robredo and two other occupants were killed in the accident.

Background
Interior and Local Government Secretary Robredo and his aide, Police Chief Inspector June Paolo Abrazado, were in Cebu to attend the National Summit of the Community Investigative Support and the Criminal Investigation and Detection Group. Robredo originally booked an airline flight from Mactan–Cebu International Airport to Manila, but instead chartered an aircraft to take him to Naga so he could be with his family.

Accident

The aircraft was a Piper PA-34-200 Seneca I, registered RP-C4431. In addition to Robredo and Abrazado there were two crew on board; the pilot who was also the CEO of Aviatour Air (the company that operated the aircraft); and the co-pilot, a Nepalese national.

En route to Naga the crew of the Seneca requested an emergency landing at Masbate Airport, citing engine problems. At around 15:30, Abrazado sent a text message, informing the recipient that they were returning to Cebu due to a problem with one of the propellers [sic]. He also asked to be re-booked for the earliest possible flight out of Mactan. However, at 16:02, Abrazado sent more messages, stating that the airplane was making an emergency landing at Masbate Airport.

Of the four people aboard the aircraft, the sole survivor, Robredo's aide, said that the airplane broke apart as it hit the water.

Search and recovery
More than 200 rescuers together with Philippine military divers and helicopters started searching for the passengers after the crash. Assistance was also provided by Korean technical divers and a lone German diver. Additionally, the United States Navy sent the USNS Safeguard, a rescue and salvage ship that was undergoing repairs in a dry dock at Subic Bay, to help.

The first part of the airplane found was the tip of the right wing. A flight manifest containing the name of Jesse Robredo was also found near the site of accident the next day. On August 20, debris from the aircraft was recovered.

President Benigno Aquino went to Masbate the day after the crash to personally receive updates on the situation. He was accompanied by Transport Secretary Mar Roxas, who said that special sonar equipment was also sent to aid in the search and that "we just want to do everything we can to save him [Robredo]." Aquino also said that Abrazado was conscious and had only a few injuries.

On August 21, Roxas announced that divers had found the inverted fuselage and that Robredo's body was brought to shore by the Philippine Coast Guard. The copilot's body was retrieved by the crew of a passenger ferry the next day after it was seen floating near the crash site.

Reactions

The government called for a prayer vigil at a chapel in Manila. The company that owns the aircraft suspended its operations without waiting for an official order. Following the retrieval of Robredo's remains, President Aquino declared a national day of mourning and announced that a state funeral would be held, while flags were flown at half-mast. Paquito Ochoa, Jr. was named to Robredo's portfolio in an interim capacity.

Investigation
President Aquino revealed details of the accident investigation and its findings during a media briefing on November 13, 2012. The investigation found that improper maintenance led to the right engine suffering an internal failure, which likely would have caused misfiring and intermittent operation of the fuel pump. The failure was gradual and the aircraft developed engine problems 23 minutes after take off. However, instead of turning back to Cebu, the pilot decided to continue the flight, until the engine failed completely 37 minutes later and the aircraft crashed during the subsequent attempt to land at Masbate. The investigation determined that the pilot didn't use the correct procedure for trying to land a Piper Seneca with one engine inoperative, in that he lowered the undercarriage and flaps too soon; and that during his last flight proficiency test he had not been tested with respect to flying with one engine inoperative.

The investigation found that the maintenance of the Seneca had been undertaken by Aviatour Air, but that the company was not authorised or approved to do so. It also found that records relating to a test flight for renewal of the aircraft's certificate of airworthiness in January 2012 had been falsified and that the test flight never took place. An airworthiness inspector of the Civil Aviation Authority of the Philippines was suspended from duty as a result, pending the outcome of a separate investigation. Representatives of the pilot's family and Aviatour Air disputed the findings.

See also
 1957 Cebu Douglas C-47 crash
 2021 Piedade de Caratinga Beechcraft King Air crash

References

External links
 RP-C4431 Report (Archive) - Civil Aviation Authority of the Philippines

Piper Seneca crash
Aviation accidents and incidents in the Philippines
Airliner accidents and incidents  caused by pilot error
Airliner accidents and incidents  caused by stalls
2012 disasters in the Philippines
History of Masbate
August 2012 events in the Philippines